Swirl is a 2011 Brazilian drama film directed by Clarissa Campolina and Helvécio Marins Jr.

Cast
 Maria Sebastian Martins Alvaro
 Luciene Soares da Silva
 Wanderson Soares da Silva
 Maria da Conceição Gomes de Moura

References

External links
 

2011 films
2010s Portuguese-language films
2011 drama films
Brazilian drama films